Sin tu mirada (English: Sightless Love) is a Mexican telenovela premiered on Las Estrellas on November 13, 2017, and concluded on April 15, 2018. Produced for Televisa by Ignacio Sada Madero. The telenovela revolves around Marina, a blind woman who because of her disability, has developed a great sensitivity.

Plot 
On a stormy night, Marina is born, apparently without life, who is received by Damiana (Cecilia Toussaint), the village midwife, who a few hours before attended the delivery of a healthy child, but unfortunately his mother died. Don Luis (Eduardo Santamarina), the father of Marina, has since married Prudencia (Claudia Ramírez), lives determined to have a son, wants an heir that transcends his illustrious surname Ocaranza. Unfortunately, Prudencia can not have children, which makes Angustias (Ana Martín) her nana convince her to benefit the family with the child who was orphaned as a mother. Thanks to this, Luis Alberto is received in a new family, where he grows surrounded by a lot of money and travels abroad to study a medical career. Meanwhile, Marina (Claudia Martín), miraculously survives and grows happy surrounded by nature next to Damiana, who teaches her to know the world in a different way, because she is blind. But as Marina grows up the doctor Isauro (Carlos de la Mota) come to town, who teaches her to read and to write and to prepare her life to being the assistant in his medical office.

An accident causes the house of Damiana burst into flames with Marina inside. Isauro without thinking, enters the hut to save her and his face is disfigured. The kind, gentle and handsome Dr. Isauro, from this moment, becomes a resentful, selfish man. A hermit who only allows and enjoys the company of Marina. The Ocaranza return to the ranch. Prudencia asks her nanny to find her daughter's grave. Angustias locates Damiana, but she refuses to confess the truth. What she wanted to tell them was that the girl did not die, but they had left and she did not agree to give up Marina, since after more than 20 years they finally came to take an interest in her. Marina has a great friend named Toribio (Luis Bayardo), although he is an older adult, his spirit is of an 8-year-old child. Toribio loves her and has always been her playmate. One day of those fun for both, Marina and Toribio are scared to hear a bullet. Toribio fled to hide, but Marina ran into Luis Alberto (Osvaldo de León), and asked him not to kill, hurt and scare the animals that had not done anything. Alberto is very impressed with the girl and tries to approach her, but Marina does not allow it, until one day they meet again, Alberto promises never to take a gun again. A beautiful feeling that nobody knew, grows between Marina and Alberto. The attraction is so intense that in an accident that brings them too close, they kiss on the lips and with the soul. Alberto reacts and feels terrible because he's Vanessa's (Scarlet Gruber) boyfriend for several years. He apologizes to Marina, tells her it was a mistake and says goodbye. Marina does not understand that for Alberto it is a mistake what for her was the most beautiful of her life.

Alberto tries futilely to continue with his life, but Marina caught his heart. Alberto decides to end his relationship with Vanessa, which she does not accept, because she is  pressured by Susana (Luz Elena González), her mother, to be  his desire. A marriage is expected and demanded by both families. Alberto's parents reject the idea of their son getting involved with a blind village girl who they mistreat and humiliate as an upstart, but the love of Alberto and Marina is immense, so they get married secretly and when she is presented as his wife, the conflict is so great, that Damiana reveals the exchange of children. Don Luis refuses to believe that he has a blind daughter and rejects her.

After Isauro finds out about the wedding of Luis Alberto and Marina, he tells Marina, who having married another man who is not him, that he has always loved her and risked his life to save her. After this strong argument Marina gets sick and Isauro decides to give her a medicine  to calm her down, but she only sleeps and he uses her to his advantage. Marina wakes in bed with him and he tells her that she had sex with him.  Marina tells Luis Alberto this and he refuses to have a child as a result of a rape, so they both separate, and decide to follow their path each one by the others side. Some time after Marina meets Ricardo Bazán (Juan Martín Jauregui), an ophthalmologist who helps her undergo an operation, and to be able to achieve, the first thing she sees is the smile of her son Rafael. Later Marina discovers that Luis Alberto has always been close to her, since they work in the same place, but thanks to Lucrecía (Candela Márquez), the new girlfriend of Luis Alberto, who will do anything possible to separate them, with the help of Ricardo who has also fallen in love with Marina.

Cast

Main 
 Claudia Martín as Marina Ríos
 Osvaldo de León as Luis Alberto
 Ana Martín as Angustias Galvéz
 Claudia Ramírez as Prudencia Arzuaga
 Luz Elena González as Susana Balmaceda
 Eduardo Santamarina as Don Luis Alberto

Also main 
 Carlos de la Mota as Isauro Sotero
 Cecilia Toussaint as Damiana Ríos
 Luis Bayardo as Toribio Guzmán
 Ignacio Guadalupe as Baldomero
 Sergio Reynoso as Margarito Prieto
 Pablo Bracho as Zacarías
 Alejandra Jurado as Ramona
 Emmanuel Orenday as Paulino Prieto
 Ilse Ikeda as Yolanda Prieto

 Scarlet Gruber as Vanessa Villoslada
 Juan Martín Jauregui as Ricardo Bazan
 Candela Márquez  as Lucrecia Zamudio

Recurring 
 Lourdes Munguía as Cristina
 Olivia Bucio as Encarnación
 Humberto Elizondo as Horacio Zamudio

Special participation 
 Isela Vega as Dominga
 Catalina López as Eulalia Hernández

Production 
Production began on September 15, 2017. The telenovela is an original story of Delia Fiallo, adapted by Gabriela Ortigoza based on the 1970 Venezuelan telenovela titled Esmeralda, and at the same time it is an adaptation of the 1997 Mexican telenovela starring Leticia Calderón, entitled Esmeralda. A total of 110 episodes were confirmed.

Filming 
The telenovela is recorded in locations such as Valle de Bravo and in Mexico City.

Casting 
On August 28, 2017, TVyNovelas magazine confirmed Claudia Martin and Osvaldo de León as main characters. On September 7, 2017 was confirmed debut of the Venezuelan actress Scarlet Gruber on Televisa as main villain of the telenovela. On October 10, 2017 Univision page confirmed Luz Elena González as the main villain. On October 7, 2017, the mass was celebrated for the beginning of the production, where the rest of the cast was confirmed as Ana Martín, Eduardo Santamarina, Cecilia Toussaint, Claudia Ramírez and Carlos de la Mota.

Episodes

Rating

Awards and nominations

References

External links 
 

2017 telenovelas
Mexican telenovelas
2017 Mexican television series debuts
2018 Mexican television series endings
Televisa telenovelas
Television series reboots
Spanish-language telenovelas